Anomoeoneis sphaerophora is a species of diatom belonging to the family Anomoeoneidaceae.

It has cosmopolitan distribution.

References

Cymbellales